Navy Commander (retired) Walter Feghabo served as the first Military Administrator of Ebonyi State in Nigeria between October 1996 and August 1998 after Ebonyi State was created from parts of Enugu State and Abia State during the military regime of General Sani Abacha. He was then appointed administrator of Delta State in August 1998 during the transitional regime of General Abdulsalami Abubakar, handing over to the elected civilian governor James Ibori on 29 May 1999. 
In June 1999, all former military administrators in the Abacha and Abubakar regimes were retired by the Federal Government, including Walter Feghabo.

See also
List of Governors of Delta State

References

Nigerian Navy officers
Living people
Nigerian military governors of Delta State
Governors of Ebonyi State
Year of birth missing (living people)